Vincent "Vince" Caso (born December 24, 1991) is an American actor and writer best known for his co-starring role as Bladezz on The Guild web series.

Background 
Vincent Caso was born in Weymouth, Massachusetts, but he was raised in Los Angeles, California where he attended a school for the Arts.  At the age of thirteen, he decided to go into acting, and within a year, he landed a role in his first feature film, American Fork, a comedy produced by Jeremy Coon of Napoleon Dynamite.  The film premiered at Slamdance in January 2007, garnering Vincent some good reviews  and his first red carpet experience  alongside fellow cast members Billy Baldwin, Kathleen Quinlan, and writer/star Hubbel Palmer.  American Fork was released in a limited number of theaters in fall of 2009, under the new name Humble Pie. He has attended classes in drama, improvisation and Shakespearean performance since his early teens, as well as performing in a variety of stage productions such as Shakespeare's "The Tempest" and several improv shows.

Career 
Despite having roles in feature films, Caso is best known for his role as Bladezz in the hit web series The Guild, which premiered in the summer of 2007.  In the series Bladezz has a little sister Dena, who is played by Caso's real-life sister Tara Caso.

Caso has made appearances at comic and gaming conventions, such as BlizzCon and Comic-Con. He also makes occasional appearances at the Magic Castle.

Caso further utilized his experience as an actor to co-found two acting schools with his father, actor Bob Caso. The Actor's Group Orlando in Ocoee, Florida, and Innovative Actor's Studio in Los Angeles, California.

Filmography as an actor 
 American Fork aka Humble Pie (2007)
 The Guild (2007–2013)
 The Jeff Lewis 5 Minute Comedy Hour (2010)
 The End (2010–2011)
 Awkward Embraces (2011)
 Between Waves (2015)
 SpaceVenture (2018)
 We're Alive: Frontier (2019)
 We're Alive: Zero Hour (2019)
 LA By Night (2019–)

References

External links 
 
 http://www.VinceCaso.com
 https://twitter.com/vincecaso
 https://www.instagram.com/vincecaso
 Cosplay Convention Interview
 Audio Interview with Chris Pope of the Tech Jives Network and Mark Eoff of Tech Barbarians
 Interview with MovieMikes
 Pop Culture Monster Interview with Vince Caso

Living people
1991 births
Male actors from Massachusetts
American male web series actors
21st-century American male actors